Ashleigh Barty was the defending champion, but withdrew before the tournament began.

Caroline Garcia won the title, defeating Donna Vekić in the final, 2–6, 7–6(7–4), 7–6(7–4).

The first two rounds, two quarterfinal matches, and part of a third quarterfinal were played on indoor hard courts after rain persisted through the first four days (and part of the fifth and sixth days) of the tournament.

Seeds

Draw

Finals

Top half

Bottom half

Qualifying

Seeds

Qualifiers

Lucky losers

Draw

First qualifier

Second qualifier

Third qualifier

Fourth qualifier

Fifth qualifier

Sixth qualifier

References

External Links 
 Main Draw
 Qualifying Draw

Nottingham Open - Singles
2019 Women's Singles
2019 Nottingham Open